Tiandi Smith (born 24 November 2001) is a Guyanese footballer who plays as a midfielder for Foxy Ladies FC. She has been a member of the Guyana women's national team.

International goals
Scores and results list Guyana's goal tally first

See also
List of Guyana women's international footballers

References

2001 births
Living people
Women's association football midfielders
Guyanese women's footballers
Guyana women's international footballers